Maria Petschnig (born 1977) is an Austrian artist and filmmaker based in Brooklyn, New York City. Her works include a variety of media including video art. Her artistic works frequently deal with memory and voyeurism. Petschnig is known for films, video and art, which explore a seedy, awkward kind of eroticism. Her works have been shown at several exhibitions in Europe and the United States including at the Museum of Modern Art in New York City. Petschnig's works have received critical reviews from The New York Times, Artforum and Art in America.

Biography

Early life
Petschnig was born in 1977 in Klagenfurt, Austria. She studied painting at the Academy of Fine Arts Vienna, the Royal College of Art, London and at the Wimbledon School of Art, London. After spending some years in Paris and London, Petschnig moved to New York City in 2003.

Art
Petschnig started her professional career in the year 2000. In her earlier videos, she frequently made use of her own body in outlandish, psychological and awkward scenarios. Through her artworks, Petschnig raises social, psychological and existential issues while complicating the viewing experience. She makes her audience aware and often uncomfortable about their voyeuristic inclinations.

Karen Rosenberg of The New York Times argued that Petschnig’s work can seem like a gentler version of Viennese Actionism's extreme body art or of the gender-bending epics of Matthew Barney. The art critic, Jerry Saltz, reviewed her work in the New York Magazine and wrote that her strange videos depict that she is the Franz Kafka of the art world.

In 2010, Petschnig's works were included in the Greater New York exhibition at the MoMA PS1 of the Museum of Modern Art in New York City. In 2013, her artworks Petschsniggle and Vasistas were exhibited nationally as well as internationally. Both of her artworks received critical reviews from multiple reputed news agencies including ARTnews and The New York Times. In 2015, Black Dog Publishing printed a monograph on Petschnig’s videos titled Nineteen Videos 2002 - 2015.

In 2021, Petschnig produced her first documentary film, Uncomfortably Comfortable. The film chronicles the life of a homeless person, Marc, who lives in his car in New York City. The film premiered at the 45th Duisburger Filmwoche, where it received the Arte-Dokumentarfilmpreis (ARTE Documentary Award) for the year 2021. Over the period of nearly 20 years, Petschnig's artworks and videos have been featured in multiple exhibitions and film festivals including the International Film Festival Rotterdam and Anthology Film Archives. She has also given talks on her work at Columbia University, Vassar College, The Institute of Contemporary Art (ICA), Moscow, National Centre for Contemporary Arts, Yekaterinburg and The New School.

Recognition
Besides having received the ARTE-Dokumentarfilmpreis, Petschnig is a recipient of the Foundation for Contemporary Arts grant and the Rema Hort Mann Foundation Grant, New York. She has also received a national grant from the Federal Ministry for Arts, Culture, the Civil Service and Sport of the Government of Austria.

Filmography

Source

References

External links
 
 

1977 births
Living people
21st-century Austrian women artists
Austrian video artists
Artists from Klagenfurt
Alumni of the Royal College of Art
Artists from Brooklyn
Austrian expatriates in the United States
Academy of Fine Arts Vienna alumni
Alumni of Wimbledon College of Arts
Austrian expatriates in the United Kingdom